GO Transit rail services are provided throughout the Greater Toronto and Hamilton Area (GTHA) and the Greater Golden Horseshoe. The GO Transit rail fleet consists of 90 MPI MP40 locomotives and 979 Bombardier BiLevel Coaches. In , the system had a ridership of  passengers per year.

GO Transit started on May 23, 1967, running single-deck trains powered by diesel locomotives in push-pull configuration on a single rail line along Lake Ontario's shoreline. When GO trains began operation, they ran on tracks mostly owned the two major freight railways of Canada: Canadian National (CN) and Canadian Pacific (CP). Over time, GO Transit (and subsequently Metrolinx) have acquired tracks, ensuring GO Transit has control over track maintenance and expansion. Metrolinx currently owns 80% of the GO's rail corridors.

All GO Transit fares are calculated by the fare zones that the origin and destination of the trip are in, as well as by passenger category (adult, student, senior or child). GO train fares are not differentiated based whether or not buses are used for part of the trip.

Lines and stations

History 
GO Transit rail service began on May 23, 1967, on a single rail line along Lake Ontario's shoreline. GO Train service ran throughout the day from Oakville to Pickering with limited rush hour train service to Hamilton. This line, now divided as the Lakeshore East and Lakeshore West lines is the keystone corridor of GO Transit, and continued to be its only rail line for its first seven years of operation. GO's other five lines were opened between 1974 and 1982, significantly expanding the rail network from 86 to 332 kilometres long, and from 16 to 43 stations.

To that point, all of GO's rail services ran on tracks mostly owned by the two major freight railways of Canada: Canadian National (CN) and Canadian Pacific (CP). in 1988, a small but significant milestone in network growth occurred when it expanded its Lakeshore East line on new track it built by itself.

The reach of GO's network remained relatively unchanged between 1996 and 2005. However, seven new infill stations were opened along the Bradford and Stouffville lines. This coincided with GO's initial purchases of the rail corridors it operated on, taking ownership of the entire Stouffville line past Scarborough station, and most of the Barrie line north of the Toronto border. In addition, GO took control of the critical Union Station Rail Corridor, which all GO trains on all lines used. By the end of 2005, GO owned over a third of its rail network.

From 2007 to 2017, GO's network saw six extensions, requiring the Bradford line to be renamed as the "Barrie line", and the Georgetown line to "Kitchener line."  These long distance extensions, along with the other extensions on the Lakeshore West, Richmond Hill and Stouffville lines, expanded GO's network length by 29%. Six critical corridor purchases were also made, tripling its length of owned corridors and bringing its ownership percentage to over 80%. Finally, 10 new stations were added, one of which coincided with the opening of the Toronto-York Spadina Subway Extension, creating a new interchange between GO and the TTC subway.

Future extensions 
 Lakeshore East to Bowmanville
 Lakeshore West to Niagara Falls (Partially open as of January 7, 2019)

Future lines

Bolton line 

GO Transit rail service to Bolton was first proposed by the Ontario government under the MoveOntario 2020 plan in June 2007.  It was subsequently carried over to The Big Move, where it was placed on the 15-year plan. In November 2010, Metrolinx completed a feasibility study that focused on utilization of Canadian Pacific Railway's Mactier subdivision, which runs from the West Toronto Diamond in Toronto northward to Bolton. Four different service alternatives were assessed to determine the best method to carry passengers into Toronto from the Mactier subdivision, and the preferred option was to direct trains east-west along CN's Halton subdivision, and north-south again along GO Transit's existing Barrie line. This would provide four new stations in the communities of Woodbridge and Kleinburg in the City of Vaughan, and Bolton in the Town of Caledon, and also use the existing Downsview Park station before terminating at Union.

The feasibility study estimated that minimum infrastructure costs were $160 million for peak direction rush-hour service, and resulting ridership was forecasted to be 2,391, 2,884, and 4,388 in 2015, 2021, and 2031, respectively, in the morning peak period. If service was increased for two-way all-day service, total costs increased to $210 million, and ridership was forecasted to be 6,074, 7,324, and 11,146 in 2015, 2021, and 2031, respectively. Metrolinx determined that the projected ridership did not justify the costs, and downgraded the Bolton line from the 15- to the 25-year plan on February 14, 2013, when amendments were made to The Big Move.

Midtown corridor and Peterborough line 

The Midtown corridor refers to three new GO Transit services in The Big Move. The first is a Crosstown line from Dundas Street to the former CP North Toronto and Leaside stations in Toronto. The second and third segments would extend east from North Toronto and/or : the Seaton line to Seaton, and the Locust Hill line to Locust Hill.

GO Transit has contemplated a Midtown corridor since the 1980s as a contingency plan once capacity at Union Station became constrained, making North Toronto an alternate station for Downtown Toronto. The major barrier to these plans, however, is the fact that the Midtown corridor is composed of existing rail lines owned and actively used by the CP as its main freight line between Ottawa, Montreal, London and Windsor. CP has been reluctant to provide capacity to GO Transit on its tracks, and the Milton line (which runs along CP tracks to the west) only came after considerable negotiations, the 1979 Mississauga train derailment, and an investment of hundreds of millions of dollars.

All three lines in the corridor were listed under the 15-year plan of The Big Move upon its publication in 2008. However, the Havelock line was moved to the 25-year plan on February 14, 2013, because of "very modest ridership potential and significant infrastructure and operational challenges related to the Agincourt rail yards."

Via Rail provided train service to Peterborough until 1990, when service was cancelled. The potential to provide commuter rail service to Peterborough was noted by GO Transit in its 2020 strategic plan, and was also included in The Big Move. Metrolinx completed a study for bringing commuter rail service to Peterborough in February 2010. Different routes were explored, all of which use CP's existing Havelock subdivision between Peterborough and Toronto. Once reaching Toronto, three different routes were explored through the east end, to deal with the same "significant infrastructure and operational challenges related to the Agincourt rail yards" that complicate GO's Havelock line. The study also kept the option open of using either Union Station or North Toronto station as the terminus of the line. Capital costs to upgrading the Havelock subdivision were estimated to be between C$329 and 384 million. GO introduced bus service between Peterborough and Oshawa on September 5, 2009.

Operations 
Since the founding of GO Transit in 1967, GO trains have operated in push-pull configuration. Each train has a locomotive on the east end and a cab control car on the west end.  In push configuration, the cab car has a complete set of engineer's controls built into it, allowing the engineer to remotely control the locomotive pushing the whole train from the back of the train. This enables trains to travel in either direction without requiring one locomotive on each end.

Onboard procedures 

All GO trains have a total of three crew members. The conductor and engineer are located in the locomotive or the cab car to operate the vehicle. Another guard-like staff member, the Customer Service Ambassador (CSA), is located in the accessibility coach, which is the fifth car from the locomotive. The CSA is responsible for opening and closing the train doors, making announcements over the PA system, and acts as the first responder in case of an emergency on board.

The CSA announces the next station after the train departs a station, and an automated voice will repeat the announcement when the train arrives at its next station. Automated public service announcements are made in both English and French.

When a train arrives at a station, the CSA puts a wheelchair bridge across the gap between the platform and the doorway. This is to allow handicapped passengers to board and exit the train. Each car has a number of accessibility seats provided. If the CSA sees a passenger with a physical disability and there are no accessibility seats available, they could ask that a passenger sitting in one of those seats to move to another area in the train to allow the passenger with a disability to sit in an accessibility seat.

Before closing the doors, the CSA will make an announcement that the doors are closing and will remind passengers to stand clear of the doorways. All cars have a speaker above the doors, which plays a door closing chime in the form of a descending major triad. The chimes are an accessibility feature intended to warn the visually-impaired that the doors are closing.

In March 2021, Metrolinx adopted the Japanese shisa kanko (pointing and calling) method. Upon entering a station, but before opening the doors, the CSA is required to point towards both ends of the train and announce that the platform is clear as a way to confirm that the train is stopped properly. After the CSA closes the doors, the same process is repeated to confirm that nobody is caught in the doors. According to Metrolinx, incorporating the pointing and calling procedure within GO Transit's daily operations is an important way to enhance safety, "especially as the transit agency gets ready to launch the largest expansion of GO service in it’s [sic] history".

Extreme weather 
In winter conditions, trains are stored near Union Station to so that afternoon and evening trains can travel through less snow. Trains are kept at specific temperatures during storage to speed up engine startup on cold days and to eliminate frozen train doors. Fans are used to blow hot air onto track switches to keep them from freezing in extreme cold. Track snow removal is conducted using high-pressure blower snow removal equipment.

In the event of exceptionally severe winter conditions, GO trains run on different schedules. Express trains will stop at all stations. The cancellation of train trips may occur, as well as replacing trains with buses.

GO Transit inspects train air conditioning more frequently during summer, as A/C systems have to work harder on hot days.

In extremely hot weather, train tracks can expand and buckle under the heat. These "sun kinks" can occur when temperatures are above 30 degrees Celsius for at least 48 hours. For safety reasons, sun kinks require trains to be operated at reduced speeds. Sun kinks are usually fixed during overnight or in the early morning.

Holiday service 
On holidays that fall on weekdays, service changes will occur. The following table shows the service type by holiday.

Service expansion 
According to Metrolinx, GO Transit rail service expansion is currently being undertaken and is expected to be complete by 2025. By 2025, GO train service will run from 5 a.m. to 2 a.m. on each line. The following table shows the expected service frequency per line when expansion is complete.

Start times and service frequency on weekends may vary.

Rolling stock

Locomotives 
The following table shows the GO Transit locomotive fleet by vehicle type.

F59PH 
The EMD F59PH is the oldest of the three currently active series of locomotives used by GO Transit. They are 3000-horsepower diesel-electric locomotives capable of travelling up to 134 kilometers an hour, and can accelerate a ten-car train from 0 to 100 km/h in about 75 seconds. The F59PH was also the first series of locomotives used by GO Transit that feature dynamic braking, the effectiveness of which was greatly increased to as low as 8 km/h.

The introduction of the first sixteen F59PH series locomotives in 1988 allowed for the retirement of the previously used EMD GP40TC locomotives. Eleven additional locomotives, delivered between 1989 and 1990, replaced the EMD F40PH and some of the EMD GP40-2L(W) locomotives. The remaining GP40-2L(W)s were replaced by fourteen more F59PHs in 1990. Finally, in 1994, six additional F59PHs replaced the EMD GP40U series. By 1994, GO Transit's locomotive fleet consisted of only the F59PH, which allowed easier maintenance.

Despite the fact that the F59PH was designed to last 30 years, the locomotives were less reliable than hoped. In 2009, when the MPI MP40PH-3C series locomotives became available, GO Transit began retiring the F59PH series. In the end, only eight F59PH units remained on the GO Transit roster. These units have been rebuilt for continued service in 2011, but will be replaced by the MPI MP54AC in future years.

MP40PH-3C 
The MPI MP40PH-3C is the older of the two currently active series of MotivePower locomotives used by GO Transit. They are 4000-horsepower locomotives capable of hauling twelve passenger cars, and have a speed of up to 150 km/h. The MP40PH-3C is GO Transit's first series of locomotives capable of supplying power to power a 12-car train all by themselves, as opposed to the F59PH which is slower and can only pull 10 cars.

In 2005, GO Transit contracted with MotivePower to build 27 MP40PH-3C units in order to expand its fleet and replace the existing F59PH locomotives which had been in service for almost 20 years. The first set of MP40PH-3Cs began arriving in late 2007 and operated on the Lakeshore East and West lines, followed by the Milton line.

The new locomotives proved to be powerful and reliable, prompting GO Transit to place an order for an additional set of 20 locomotives. Deliveries of the new set began in late 2009 and continued into 2010. An additional set of ten locomotives was delivered in 2010.

The introduction of the MP40PH-3C allowed GO Transit to retire the older F59PH locomotives. Another ten MP40PH-3C locomotives were purchased later and were delivered in 2013 and 2014 when GO Transit found that additional equipment was required to expand rail service.

MP54AC 
The MPI MP54AC is the latest series of locomotives used in the GO Transit rail system. It is a 5400-horsepower locomotive that MPI calls "the most powerful diesel passenger locomotive in North America".

GO Transit was the first customer to use the MP54AC. In 2012, GO Transit MP40PH-3C #647 was sent back to MPI and was converted into an MP54AC. It was returned to GO Transit in 2015. Testing of the converted locomotive was conducted December 12, 2015.

The original plan was to convert ten MP40PH-3Cs into MP54ACs if the first conversion was successful. However, increasing service demands led to the order of sixteen brand new MP54ACs instead. Once delivered, these new MP54ACs would allow for the retirement of the remaining eight F59PH units.

Passenger cars 
The following tables shows the GO Transit’s 979 Bilevel passenger cars.

Maintenance and storage

Maintenance facilities 
The Willowbrook Rail Maintenance Facility is GO's original rail maintenance facility, covering . It is along the Lakeshore West line, directly west of Mimico GO Station, and directly north of Via Rail's Toronto Maintenance Centre. The yard includes four progressive maintenance bays, a locomotive shop, a coach repair shop and storage tracks for 21 trains.

In 2018, GO Transit opened the Whitby Rail Maintenance Facility, along the Lakeshore East line. It includes two progressive maintenance bays, repair shops for 11 coaches and 12 locomotives, two washing stations and storage tracks for 13 trains. The facility was constructed to handle service expansions, which include the GO Transit Regional Express Rail program.

Train layovers 

Metrolinx is planning a new storage facility along the Richmond Hill GO Line south of Oriole GO Station near York Mills Road.
Metrolinx is also planning a new layover facility to hold five trains parallel to the Lakeshore East line just east of Midland Avenue.

Overhaul 

From 2004 to 2011 Ontario Northland Railway overhauled 121 Bi-Level cars at their North Bay Yard.

Controversies 

In December 2018, GO Transit banned CSA Gordon "Gord" Plumridge from singing Christmas carols over the PA system on the train after a complaint from a passenger. Plumridge, who had been singing Christmas carols for over a decade, created parodies of popular Christmas carols inspired by GO Transit (for example, he changed the lyrics of "Let It Snow! Let It Snow! Let It Snow!" to "Take the GO, take the GO, take the GO!") and sang them on the Barrie line and Lakeshore West line. Many passengers were fond of Plumridge's service and singing. When asked about the reason for the ban by CTV News, Metrolinx spokesperson Anne Marie Aikins said, "We understand that a customer didn't appreciate the singing, 'cause he was up in the Quiet Zone, and the Quiet Zone, people really like it that it's quiet, and that they can sleep." She stated that a compromise was made between Plumridge and Bombardier, the company who was contracted to provide services to GO Transit. Plumridge was now allowed to sing only to the people in his train coach with permission.

References

General references 
 
 Part of collection: Lakeshore, Georgetown, Richmond Hill, Milton, Bradford, Stouffville corridors, and GO ALRT

Bibliography 
 

GO Transit